Czechoslovak Army in the West refers to Czechoslovak military units that served with the Western Allies during the Second World War:
Czechoslovak 11th Infantry Battalion
1st Czechoslovak Armoured Brigade (1943–1945)
Non-British personnel in the RAF during the Battle of Britain#Czechoslovakia
List of Royal Air Force aircraft squadrons#Czechoslovakian (310–313):
 No. 310 Squadron RAF
 No. 311 Squadron RAF
 No. 312 (Czechoslovak) Squadron RAF
 No. 313 Squadron RAF